The All-Star Futures Game is an annual baseball exhibition game hosted by Major League Baseball (MLB) in conjunction with the mid-summer MLB All-Star Game. A team of American League-affiliated prospects competes against a team of National League-affiliated prospects. From the inaugural 1999 event through 2018, teams of prospects from the United States faced off against teams of prospects from other countries.

Origins

The Futures Game was conceived by Jimmie Lee Solomon, an Executive Vice President of Baseball Operations for Major League Baseball, looking for an event to showcase the minor leagues and round out the All-Star week festivities. Early versions of the game created marginal interest in the baseball community, but the event has attracted more attention in later years.

Format 

Rosters are selected by a joint committee consisting of people from Major League Baseball, MLB.com, and Baseball America magazine. All 30 MLB organizations are represented, with up to two players from any organisation and 25 players per team. One team is made up of prospects from American League organizations and the other of National League prospects. From 1999 to 2018, teams were divided into U.S. and World teams based on place of birth. Any player selected to the All-Star Futures Game but promoted to the majors prior to the game is replaced.

Players born in Puerto Rico were part of the World team despite being U.S. citizens by birth, because that territory has its own national baseball federation and national team.

The game is played by the same rules listed in the Official Baseball Rules published by Major League Baseball. Exceptions are game duration and the handling of tie games. From 2008 through 2018, games lasted 9 innings. From 1999 to 2007 and since 2019, games last seven innings. Through 2018, up to two extra innings were available to settle a tie after playing all regulation innings. In 2019 and since 2021, one extra inning may be played, with each half-inning starting with a runner at second base, the last player put out. The home team wins if they take the lead in the 7th or 8th inning; the visitors win if they hang on in either inning; the game is over if it is tied after eight.

Changes in 2008 

Two major changes took place in the 2008 game:

 For the first time, the United States team was drawn from the pool of players selected by USA Baseball for the 2008 Summer Olympics in Beijing.
 The game lasted nine innings in regulation, rather than seven.

Changes in 2019 

Two major changes took place in the 2019 game:

 The teams are now called the National League and American League. Players for each are drawn from affiliates of MLB teams in the corresponding MLB leagues.
 The regulation game is now seven innings. If the game is tied after seven, one additional inning is played, with each batting team starting its half with a runner on second base. The 2019 game was tied 2–all after seven innings of regulation, no runs were scored in the eighth inning, and that was how the game ended.

Larry Doby Award
Note: For the award winners, see the "MVP" column in the "Results" section (below).
Each year, an award is presented to the game's most valuable player. Multiple award winners have gone on to become MLB All-Stars, denoted in the below table of game results. In 2003, the award name was changed from Futures Game Most Valuable Player Award to the Larry Doby Award, named after National Baseball Hall of Fame inductee Larry Doby (1923–2003). Note that the similarly named Larry Doby Legacy Award is an unrelated award presented by the Negro Leagues Baseball Museum.

Results

Notes

Media coverage
From 1999 to 2013, ESPN2 held the rights to the futures game. From 2014 to 2021, MLB Network held the rights. Beginning with the 2022 season, the game airs on Peacock.

See also

All-Star Futures Game all-time roster

References

External links

Official website

Futures Game
Futures Game
Recurring sporting events established in 1999
Minor league baseball competitions
Annual events in Major League Baseball